Mitrella dichroa is a species of small sea snail in the family Columbellidae, the dove snails.

Description
The length of the shell attains 7.6 mm.

Distribution
This species occurs in the Caribbean Sea, the Gulf of Mexico and the Lesser Antilles.

References

 Rosenberg, G., F. Moretzsohn, and E. F. García. 2009. Gastropoda (Mollusca) of the Gulf of Mexico, pp. 579–699 in Felder, D.L. and D.K. Camp (eds.), Gulf of Mexico–Origins, Waters, and Biota. Biodiversity. Texas A&M Press, College Station, Texas
 Petit R.E. (2009) George Brettingham Sowerby, I, II & III: their conchological publications and molluscan taxa. Zootaxa 2189: 1–218.

External links
 Sowerby, G. B., I. (1844). Monograph of the genus Columbella. In G. B. Sowerby II (ed.), Thesaurus conchyliorum, or monographs of genera of shells. Vol. 1 (4): 109-146bis, pls 36-40. London, privately published.
 Duclos P.L. (1846-1850). Colombella. In J.C. Chenu, Illustrations conchyliologiques ou description et figures de toutes les coquilles connues vivantes et fossiles, classées suivant le système de Lamarck modifié d'après les progrès de la science et comprenant les genres nouveaux et les espèces récemment découvertes. Volume 4
 Petit de la Saussaye, S. (1853). Descriptions de coquilles nouvelles. Journal de Conchyliologie. 4: 360-369, pl. 11-13
 Rosenberg, G.; Moretzsohn, F.; García, E. F. (2009). Gastropoda (Mollusca) of the Gulf of Mexico, Pp. 579–699 in: Felder, D.L. and D.K. Camp (eds.), Gulf of Mexico–Origins, Waters, and Biota. Texas A&M Press, College Station, Texas

dichroa
Gastropods described in 1844